Toy boy may refer to:

 Toy boy (slang)
 "Toy Boy", a song by Sinitta
 "Toy Boy" (Mika song)
 "Toy Boy", a song by Stuck in the Sound
 Toy Boy (film)
 Toy Boy (TV series), a 2019 Spanish series